Filipino Catholic Church may refer to:
Catholic Church in the Philippines
Philippine Independent Church, officially known as Iglesia Filipina Independiente and colloquially called the "Aglipayan Church"